Kongōchō-ji is a Shingon Buddhist Temple located in Muroto, Kōchi, Japan. It is the 26th temple of the Shikoku Pilgrimage.

References 

Buddhist pilgrimage sites in Japan
Buddhist temples in Kōchi Prefecture
Kōyasan Shingon temples